Charles Leighfield Jonah Doman FRBS (31 August 1884 – 19 March 1944) was a sculptor from Nottingham.

Career
Born in 1884, he was the son of George L. Doman, a stone carver and monumental mason. He trained at the Nottingham School of Art from 1897 to 1901, where he was a pupil of Joseph Else. Then he worked for his father and studied at the Royal College of Art in South Kensington, London from 1905 to 1908.

He married Selina Maud Alton in 1908 in Nottingham.

Sculpture which is visible in public buildings includes the Bust of Lord Trent at Highfields Park, Nottingham, Civic Law at Nottingham Council House, and The Port of London Authority building, erected in 1928.

He taught sculpture at the Putney School of Art. In 1923 he became an associate member of the Royal Society of British Sculptors and 1938 he was elected a Fellow.

Doman designed the Allied Subjects' Medal which was issued in 1922. This medal design was produced for a War Office competition of 1921. He also designed the 1928 Armistice medal (marking 10 years since the end of the First World War) which was issued by the Royal Mint.

He died on 19 March 1944 in the southwest London suburb of Wimbledon (then in the county of Surrey) and left an estate valued at £2,892 1s 7d..

Works
Sculpture of Truth, Nottingham Castle Museum, 1904 
Sculpture, Port of London Authority Building, London, 1922
Sculpture, Lloyds, Leadenhall Street, London 1925 
Sculpted relief, Liberty's, 208-222 Regent Street, London, 1925-28 
Sculpted relief Charity, Royal Academy of Arts, 1929
Sculpture of Civic Law, Nottingham Council House, 1929
Sculptural group Boy and Pelican, Royal Academy of Arts, 1929 
Relief Panel, Half Landing, Administrative Block, Royal Masonic Hospital, Ravenscourt Park, London, 1933
Bust of Jesse Boot, 1st Baron Trent, Highfields Park, University of Nottingham, 1934
Reliefs, Home Ales brewery building, Daybrook, Nottingham, 1936
Sculpted panel of Solicitude, exhibited at the Royal Academy of Arts, 1937
Bust of Dick Sheppard, 1938

References

1884 births
1944 deaths
Alumni of Nottingham School of Art
Alumni of the Royal College of Art
English medallists
British architectural sculptors
English male sculptors
Fellows of the Royal British Society of Sculptors
Artists from Nottingham